The Aberdeen Saturday Pioneer was a weekly newspaper edited and published by L. Frank Baum between 1890 and 1891. The first issue of the weekly appeared on January 25, 1890, and the paper was based in Aberdeen, South Dakota. Baum bought a local paper, The Dakota Pioneer, from John H. Drake and renamed it as The Aberdeen Saturday Pioneer.

The Pioneer presented Baum's views on politics, suffrage, tolerance, and religion, providing an important key for deciphering the themes which would later appear in his fictional works, especially his fourteen Oz books. Baum stood strongly in support of women's suffrage and his editorials also contained discussion of theosophical religious beliefs. In his column titled Our Landlady, Baum published satirical and humorous views of the Dakota region, introducing a fictitious boarding house keeper with strong political views named Sairy Ann Bilkins in the first issue.

Baum published two editorials on Native Americans in The Pioneer on December 20th 1890 and January 3rd 1891, which have since attracted controversy due to their strong advocacy for racial genocide. In the first, Baum comments on the passing of Lakota leader Sitting Bull, expressing some sympathy for his actions: "He was an Indian with a white man's spirit of hatred and revenge for those who had wronged him and his. In his day he saw his son and his tribe gradually driven from their possessions: forced to give up their old hunting grounds and espouse the hard working and uncongenial avocations of the whites. And these, his conquerors, were marked in their dealings with his people by selfishness, falsehood and treachery. What wonder that his wild nature, untamed by years of subjection, should still revolt? What wonder that a fiery rage still burned within his breast and that he should seek every opportunity of obtaining vengeance upon his natural enemies." However, he brands Sitting Bull the last of "the nobility of the Redskin" with remaining Natives described as "a pack of whining curs who lick the hand that smites them." He concludes the editorial by arguing for the extermination of Native American peoples: "The Whites," Baum wrote, "by law of conquest, by justice of civilization, are masters of the American continent, and the best safety of the frontier settlements will be secured by the total annihilation of the few remaining Indians. Why not annihilation?"

In the second editorial of January 3rd 1891, pertaining to the Wounded Knee massacre, he argues “Having wronged them for centuries we had better, in order to protect our civilization, follow it up by one more wrong and wipe these untamed and untamable creatures from the face of the earth. In this lies future safety for our settlers and the soldiers who are under incompetent commands. Otherwise, we may expect future years to be as full of trouble with the redskins as those have been in the past. An eastern contemporary, with a grain of wisdom in its wit, says that "when the whites win a fight, it is a victory, and when the Indians win it, it is a massacre.""

Some commenters have argued Baum's views elsewhere display greater nuance with regard to the plight of Native Americans, particularly in his later children's novel The Wonderful Wizard of Oz published a decade later, containing allegorical references to the treatment of Native peoples. 

Due to financial problems the paper ceased publication, with the final issue of The Pioneer being published on March 21, 1891.

References

1890 establishments in South Dakota
1891 disestablishments in South Dakota
Defunct weekly newspapers
Defunct newspapers published in South Dakota
Newspapers established in 1890
Publications disestablished in 1891